Aapki Antara (International title: Antara), produced by Drishtant Media, is a soap opera which ran on Zee TV from 1 June 2009 through 18 February 2010 as a social problem drama focusing on the issue of autism.

Initially scheduled to premiere on 25 May 2009, it was postponed and premiered on 1 June 2009.

Plot
Aapki Antara is the story of a five-year-old girl named Antara. She is born to Anuradha, who had a relationship out of wedlock with Aditya Verma. When Anuradha dies in a car accident, Antara is orphaned, leaving Aditya with the responsibility of taking his illegitimate daughter home to his wife, Vidya, and son, Abhishek, and raising her as a part of his family.

With Antara in their life, things are not the same again for the Verma family. Antara does not behave like a normal child, being unable to express her emotions and living in her own world. To the outside world, she is a daydreamer and slow child. Eventually, Antara is revealed to have autism. Both she and her family are faced with the journey of navigating the world and being accepted by the society Antara is brought up in. Through her story, the show guides people to understand the needs of those with autism and handle them with sensitivity.

Cast
 Anjum Farooki as Antara Verma - Aditya and Anuradha's daughter; Vidya's step-daughter; Abhishek's half-sister 
 Aaina Mehta as Teenage Antara
 Zaynah Vastani as Child Antara
 Darshan Pandya as 
Aditya Verma - Aarti's brother; Anuradha's ex-fiancé; Vidya's husband; Antara and Abhishek's father (Dead)
Abhishek Verma - Aditya and Vidya's son; Antara's half-brother 
 Sahil Deshmukh Khan as Teenage Abhishek 
 Raj Simaria as Child Abhishek 
 Prabhleen Sandhu / Kshitee Jog as Vidya Verma - Aditya's widow; Abhishek's mother; Antara's step-mother 
 Rupali Ganguly as Anuradha Rai - Aditya's ex-fiancée; Antara's late single mother (Dead)
 Himanshu Malhotra / Prashant Ranyal as Sameer Malhotra - Aditya's friend; Aarti's husband; Mili's adoptive father 
 Tulika Upadhyay as Aarti Verma Malhotra - Aditya's sister; Sameer's wife; Mili's adoptive mother 
 Apurva Paranjape as Mili Malhotra - Sameer and Aarti's adopted daughter
 Raayo S. Bakhirta as Billu Gupta – Abhishek and Antara's friend
 Sandeep Upadhyay as Teenage Billu
 Aarav Velhal as Child Billu
 Nikhil Ratanparkhi as Mr. Gupta - Aditya and Vidya's neighbour; Billu's father
 Alka Mogha as Mrs. Gupta - Aditya and Vidya's neighbour; Billu's mother 
 Sujata Kumar as Kiran - Vidya's mother 
 Vijay Aidasani as Vidya's father 
 Sachin Khurana as Vikram Saxena - Vidya's childhood friend; Antara's doctor

References

Zee TV original programming
2009 Indian television series debuts
2010 Indian television series endings
Autism in television
Indian drama television series